Mount Fridovich is a small mountain in Antarctica,  high, standing at the north side of the terminus of Leverett Glacier and marking the western limit of the Harold Byrd Mountains. It was named by the Advisory Committee on Antarctic Names for Lieutenant Bernard Fridovich, U.S. Navy, a meteorologist with the winter party at McMurdo Sound, 1957.

References

Mountains of Marie Byrd Land